Khorel is a rural locality (a selo) in Kirkinsky Selsoviet, Magaramkentsky District, Republic of Dagestan, Russia. The population was 634 as of 2010. There are 21 streets.

Geography 
Khorel is located 17 km southwest of Magaramkent (the district's administrative centre) by road. Kirka and Dzhepel are the nearest rural localities.

Nationalities 
Lezgins live there.

References 

Rural localities in Magaramkentsky District